Trick riding refers to the act of performing stunts while horseback riding, such as the rider standing upright on the back of a galloping horse, using a specially designed saddle with a reinforced steel horn, and specialized kossak loops for hands and feet.  The horse is likewise galloping free.
Trick riding is not to be confused with equestrian vaulting, which is an internationally recognized competitive sport governed by the Federation Equestre Internationale (FEI).

Horse riding stunts have been performed in many films, as well as in equestrian events such as Equitana and the official opening of the Australian Equine and Livestock Events Centre, rodeos, and much more.

This stunt is preformed on the musical theatre production of "The Man from Snowy River: Arena Spectacular".  The trick riders for the show included Deborah Brennan and Zelie Bullen (née Thompson) (who has also taken part in other horse shows such as Equitana).

History
Trick riding was initially used for military purposes by the Russian Cossacks, who adopted the practice from the people of the Caucasus and labeled it dzhigitovka. When communism overtook Russia, Cossacks were forced to immigrate out of the country. Many moved to America, where they used their talents for money. Trick riding eventually became a rodeo event where the amount of points a rider received was dependent on the difficulty of the trick. Trick riding as a competitive rodeo event came to an end in the 1940s, as it was deemed too dangerous of a sport. 

Trick riders such as Shirley Lucas and Sharon Lucas became famous horse stunt women doubling for many movie stars such as Marilyn Monroe, Lauren Bacall, Betty Grable, Lana Turner, and many more. In films, stunt riders have included Hank Durnew and Ken Maynard (1895–1973).

Rex Rossi was a World Champion Trick Rider in 1950 and 1961, World Champion Trick Roper 1971, and Hall of Fame Movie Stunt Man, a career that spanned 60 years. Rossi performed horse and falling stunts in Bonanza, Gunsmoke, and many western movies. He also stunt doubled for Clint Eastwood, Kevin Costner, Jeff Bridges, Roy Rogers, and Bob Steele. Rossi trick rode at Madison Square Garden for 19 consecutive years. His Veach Trick Riding saddle is on display at the Gene Autry Cowboy Museum in Los Angeles.

Individual tricks
There are many horse riding stunts and many different variations of tricks, with each rider having an individual style. Tricks can be strap tricks or vault type tricks. Some tricks include the forward fender, layout fender (also known as the Indian Hideaway), one foot stand , spritz stand, shoulder stand, back drag, hippodrome, vault, reverse one foot stand, and spin the horn.

One type of trick riding is known as "Roman riding", and is usually performed as entertainment in rodeos, circuses and horse shows. In Roman riding, the rider stands atop a pair of horses, with one foot on each horse.

Roman riding is one of the older forms of riding, and was performed during the time of the Roman Empire. As many as five horses, with the rider standing on the inner three, have been ridden and jumped abreast.  As many as nine horses, three teams of three abreast, have been ridden and jumped in tandem. Tricks such as trading teams while riding, riding a pony team between the horse team and jumping six- and nine-horse tandems are also performed. Sometimes riders will change teams at the trot, dance, ride backward and twirl a baton, and even jump through fire.

Trick moves
 One Foot stand
 Shoulder Stand
 Forward Fender
 Layout Fender 
 Spin The Horn
 Hippodrome
 Vault
tail drag
suicide drag
strode layout
around the neck
the lay-up

References

External links

 Trick Riding new attraction for King of the Ranges
 Trick Riding; A Lost Art
 The History of Trick Riding with over 300 trick riding photos. 

 
Circus skills
Stunts
Rodeo-affiliated events